Ayya Vaikundar (c.1833 –c.1851) also known as  Siva Narayanar or Vaikunda Swami is the first and the foremost Purna avatar  of Eka-Paran as per Ayyavazhi Mythology. He was born to Lord Narayana and his consort Goddess Lakshmi at the Sea of Tiruchendur on the 20th of Masi, 1008 K.E (1 March 1833 CE). Embodied with the triune God-heads along with all lesser devas, Lord Narayana assumes his ninth incarnation at the sea-shore of Tiruchendur just before the birth of Ayya Vaikundar. It was this Avatar of Lord Narayana whom give birth to Ayya Vaikundar later, and all these events are part of his grand and systematic framework for the destruction of Kali. Earlier, as the time for the destruction of Kali approaches, Goddess Lakshmi, who includes all Devis (feminine forms of Devas) of the divine cosmos into herself, was sent to Sea of Tiruchendur to grow as a giant golden fish called Makara.  It was from her womb the Infant Ayya Vaikundar was born to Lord Narayana and the Vinchai was granted to him immediately after his birth.

The mission of the Destruction of Kali involves a joint role of Lord Narayana and Ayya Vaikundar. While the prime obligation of Lord Narayana is to annihilate Kali, the role of Ayya Vaikundar is to prepare the world for the Dharma Yukam. Literally, Ayya Vaikundar acts as the subtle medium on whom Lord Narayana had based his platform in the Kaliyuga to destroy Kali, the foremost evil of the 7 yugas. Since Ayya Vaikundar is born after the severe Tapas of Trimurthi and all other lesser other Devas including the 33 clans of devas and 44 clans of deva-rishis of Seven Logas, Ayya Vaikundar is the supreme God on his own. He is the central character of Kaliyuga as in the narratives and teaching of Akilathirattu Ammanai.

On the other hand, Ayya Vaikundar is an actual Historical figure and most of the preachings and activities found in Akilam and other texts about the life of Ayya Vaikundar was documented historically and detailed in critical contemporary sources externally as well. Though the prime features of Ayya Vaikundar's mission is revealed through Akilathirattu, he also teaches orally.  His oral teaching are compiled in the Books of Pathiram, Sivakanta Athikara Pathiram and Thingal Patham. Though Akilam is directly against creating any form of organised religion or belief, the teachings of Akilam and especially few books of Arul Nool forms the basis of Ayyavazhi belief. The incarnational date of Ayya Vaikundar is  celebrated as Ayya Vaikunda Avataram on the 20th of Masi as per the Tamil Calendar (3 or 4 March C.E) and is observed to this date.

Early life
In 1809, a baby born (lit. "Vishnu with a crown") to Ponnu Madan and Veyilal Amma at Poovandanthope in the Kanyakumari District (part of Travancore then). The baby boy was named Mudisoodum Perumal. Due to objections,  the name was changed to Muthukutty, since people scheduled as lower classes are objected to use the names of Gods and was required to use names which sounds prosaic by the then Travancore rulers.

The religious book, Akilam of Ayyavazhi mythology mentions that the child was still-born, and then the soul of the deva Sampooranathevan was placed in the body.

Mudisoodum Perumal, a religious boy, had special interest in the worship of the Hindu god Vishnu (Narayana). The holy book Akilam mentions that he had set a pedestal for Vishnu in his house and worshipped the deity devoutly. At the age of seventeen, He married Thirumalammal from the nearby village of Puviyur, and started a family with her. However, some believe that they were not married at all, but that, she had come to live with him only to serve him during his public activities. Thirumalammal had been previously married, but left her former husband to marry Mudisoodum Perumal. According to quotes found in Akilam, they had a male child, who was sired by her first husband. He earned his living as a Palmyra palm climber and as an agricultural laborer.

In his twenty-fourth year, Mudisoodum Perumal was struck by a severe illness and suffered for a year. His mother Veyilal Amma took her sick son to the temple at Thiruchendur, during a festival. There, He went into the sea and disappeared. According to legends in the Akilathirattu Ammanai, on the third day (March 4, 1833), he appeared transforming into Ayya Vaikundar from Sampooranathevan and declared to Veyilal Amma that he was no longer her son, but the son of Narayana. Then he started walking towards Detchanam. This place became a holy place for the devotees of Ayyavazhi and they erected a temple there named Avatharappathi at Thiruchendur. This event is celebrated during the festival of Ayya vaikundar avataram, on 20th of the Tamil Month of Masi.

Penance and growing following

Upon reaching Poovantanthoppu, (present-day Swamithopu), he undertook a penance. The penance consisted of three stages, each spanning two years. A tradition describes his postures during the six-year tavam as follows: during the first two years, he stood inside a six feet deep pit; during the next two years, he squatted on the ground; and during the last two years, he sat on a raised platform. His appearance was squalid, "long and entangled plait of hair" and frayed clothes. He spoke less and subsisted on frugal meals.

The Akilam speaks of the act of incinerating the evil spirits as an important event in the life of Ayya Vaikundar. It took place when he was performing his penance, which had been announced by him to be the means of destroying the kalimayai - the illusory evil force.  He, then, gathered the people around, and caused some of them to get possessed of the evil spirits (peyattam). The possessed ones came and danced in front of the crowd as if the evil spirits had come upon them. Vaikundar, then, ordered these evil spirits to make an oath, in front of the people, to surrender their powers and get burned up in flames. When he had finished his orders, those dancing under the duress of possession got exhausted and fell flat on the ground. Thus the evil spirits were incinerated.

Vaikundar performed another action to 'seize the esoteric evil powers'. The Akilam says that, he took away the powers of those who knew to perform witchcraft, sorcery, and other magical rituals. People living in the hills, called as Kanikkarar, were believed to be powerful shamans or witchdoctors, having powers to contain or to provoke the demons. Vaikundar, in a trance, made some of these Kanikkarar to testify in front of the people that they had surrendered their powers. People grew appreciative of Vaikundar's actions. They began addressing him as Vaikuntacami. This implied an attribution of divinity to Vaikundar.

The fame of Vaikundar had begun to spread in the countries of Travancore and Tirunelveli, and he had been gradually recognised socially as a religious person with extraordinary powers. In the religious parlance of the time, he was addressed as a Pantaram, a religious person hailing from, and serving the ordinary folk. Akilattirattu addresses him as Pantaram.

People came to him to listen to his teachings and instructions, to be cured by him of different diseases, to witness, worship and serve a religious person. Vaikundar encouraged the people to come together around a well to take a ritual bath, irrespective of caste differences. He encouraged them to dine together in his presence.

He gave out a number of teachings and instructions, the central point of which was that he had come to abolish Kali Yukam, and to usher in an age of Dharma Yukam, during the time of which the now-oppressed and suffering people would be liberated and rule the land under his leadership. 'Uplift of the lowly is dharmam’. was a constant refrain in his teachings. People were encouraged to serve as catalysts for the destruction of Kali by transforming themselves to be 'people of Dharma Yukam' and to acquire a new character. The new character would come upon them, he said, if they learned to live with self-respect, social dignity and fearlessness. Underscoring the importance of self-respect and social dignity, he said,  ‘if one lives with dignity and self-respect, the kali would destroy itself’. He said when people grew out of kalimayai, Dharma Yukam would unfold itself and in that age, he would rule over the people as Dharma Raja, the king of Dharma Yukam.

Arrest and post-imprisonment

Vaikundar made some controversial statements like mentioning the Travancore king as ‘Devil in Ananthapuri’ and the British rule as ‘Rule of White Devils’. Against the background of the growing popularity of Ayya Vaikundar and the convergence of people around him in multitudes, a complaint was lodged against him with the King of Travancore Swathi Thirunal Rama Varma . The King arrested Ayya Vaikundar in 1838 and imprisoned him at Singarathoppe jail. After 110 days of imprisonment, on 26 March 1839 he was released by Swathithirunal on the advise of Thycaud Ayya who was the Guru of Swathi thirunal Maharaj and a disciple of Ayya Vaikundar as well.

After returning from the prison, Ayya Vaikundar inspired a group of his devotees to undertake a religious exercise called Thuvayal Thavasu. He also performed miracles. He married Saptha Kanniyar as Narayana (see: Marriage with the Seven Virgins), the seven deities in the form of Ekam (see:Marriage with the Deities). He initiated festivities (see: Festivals and Celebrations). The deities were made to 'come upon' some of the female devotees who became their human media and a marriage ceremony was performed. Ceremonial processions were held amidst singing, incantations and shouts of joy by the followers. Several rites and rituals were instituted during these occasions.

Death and Legacy

Later Vaikundar was invited by his devotees to their homes and treated in a grand manner. By way of soliciting his blessings, his devotees carried him to different places. During these occasions, he laid foundations in various places for small shrine-like centres, called Nizhal Thangals. Vaikundar came to recognize five individuals as his closest disciples. Through one of his disciples, Hari Gopalan Citar, he wrote the holy book, called Akilam.

Vaikundar died on 3 June 1851. According to Ayyavazhi followers, he has returned to his celestial abode Vaikundam. However, this date is disputed, as Samuel Mateer mentions the year as 1848. 

His body was interned in a tomb and a pati (temple) was built around the same later. His devotees continued to visit this site, and performed the rituals as they used to do when Vaikundar was bodily present. His life and works remain the foundation of the Ayyavazhi. The head temple of the Ayyavazhi religion is the Swamithoppepathi and is located in the Village of Swamithope.

Popular culture
The film Ayyavazhi released in 2008 was based on the life of Ayya Vaikundar. The film Oru Kudaikul (2021) also featured the tale of Ayya Vaikundar.

References

2. Benjamín Preciado-Solís (1984). The Kṛṣṇa Cycle in the Purāṇas: Themes and Motifs in a Heroic Saga. Motilal Banarsidass. p. 40. ., Quote: "Within a period of four or five centuries [around the start of the common era], we encounter our major sources of information, all in different versions. The Mahabharata, the Harivamsa, the Visnu Purana, the Ghata Jataka, and the Bala Carita all appear between the first and the fifth century AD, and each of them represents a tradition of a Krsna cycle different from the others".

3. Edward Geoffrey Parrinder (1997). Avatar and Incarnation: The Divine in Human Form in the World's Religions. Oxford: Oneworld. pp. 19–24, 35–38, 75–78, 130–133. .

4. D. Muthu Prakash (2021), LIFE STORY OF CREATOR AND PROTECTOR OF UNIVERSE LORD MAHA VISHNU’S INCARNATE Ayya Vaikundar, IASF Publications, Chennai

Sources 

 
 
 
 
 
 
 
  
  
  
 
 
 
"Holy Akilathirattu", R. Hari Gopalan Citar, Thenthamarikualam, 10 December 1841, First Publication 1939
"Holy Akilathirattu Scripture", R. Gopalakrishnan, Chennai, First Publication 2019, Published by Akilattirattu India Mission
"Holy Akilathirattu Descriptive Text" Part 2, A. Manibharathi, Chennai, First Publication 2003
"Holy Akilathirattu Text", T. Balasundaram M.A.,B.Ed. Swamithoppu, Third Publication 2013, Published by Ayya Vaikundar Veeman Citar Foundation
"Holy Akilathirattu Ammani Recitation Text", A. Arisundra Mani, First Publication 2002

External links

 
1833 births
1851 deaths
19th-century Indian people
Akilattirattu Ammanai
Ayyavazhi
Shudra Hindu saints
Tamil Hindu saints
Ayyavazhi mythology